"Ask Me How I Am" was the fifth single released by Irish indie rock band Snow Patrol, and the first to come from their second album, When It's All Over We Still Have to Clear Up. It was released on 20 November 2000 under the Jeepster record label and reached number 96 on the UK Singles Chart. The News Letter described the song's beat as funky.

Music video
The music video for the song was warmly received by Hot Press, who called it "top-class". Reviewer Rory Cobbe wrote that the video was "clever" and the twist at the end "lovely". It further wrote that it was proof that a good idea can beat a "million pounds' worth of effects".

Track listing 
Maxi CD:
 "Ask Me How I Am" - 2:36
 "In Command of Cars" - 4:01
 "Talk to the Trees" - 1:57

Charts

References

External links

2000 singles
Snow Patrol songs
Songs written by Gary Lightbody
Jeepster Records singles
2000 songs
Songs written by Mark McClelland
Songs written by Jonny Quinn